Jill Murphy (5 July 1949 – 18 August 2021) was a British author and illustrator of children's books. First published in 1974 at the age of 24, she was best known for the Worst Witch novels and Large Family picture books, with sales amounting to several millions. Her books have also been adapted for stage and television. She has been called "one of the most engaging writers and illustrators for children in the land".

Biography

Early life
Born in London, the daughter of Reeney (Irene) and Eric Murphy, Jill Murphy was brought up in Chessington, Surrey. Reminiscing about growing up in post-war Britain, she said: "I had a classic 1950s childhood. My mum was at home, because in those days that's what mums did. My dad worked in an aircraft factory. He was up really early in the morning, came home exhausted at night and I didn’t really see him." She won a scholarship to the Roman Catholic grammar school in Wimbledon. She showed an interest in writing and drawing at the age of 6; although not excelling in other school subjects, she had made her own enormous library of hand-written and illustrated books while still at primary school. She enjoyed reading boarding-school stories, which provided material and inspiration for Miss Cackle's Academy in the Worst Witch series, as did the Ursuline High School, Wimbledon, which she attended. She grew up a Roman Catholic, but she did not practise the faith in later years. Her stay-at-home mother was a "book maniac" and her father was an Irish engineer.

The Worst Witch
Murphy started to write The Worst Witch – "the magical tale of an accident-prone girl attempting to navigate the magical codes and murky corridors of Miss Cackle's Academy for Witches" – while still at school (Murphy admitted to having herself been the model for her protagonist Mildred Hubble), but put the book on hold while she attended Chelsea and Croydon Art Schools. She continued to write it during a year living in a village in Togo, West Africa, and later while working as a nanny back in the UK. After receiving rejection letters from publishers to whom she offered the book (as she recalls, "They said children would be frightened about a school for witches..."), in 1970 when she was 21 she decided to try the new young company Allison & Busby (founded by Clive Allison and Margaret Busby), as the result of a series of coincidences involving Murphy having spent time in Ghana, and a friend meeting Ghanaian Margaret Busby at a party in London. Murphy said she was "thrilled to find the publishers were quirky like me". "They accepted it immediately, and printed 5,000 copies, and I remember wondering how many aunts and uncles I had, and what we would do with the rest," she said in an interview with The Telegraph. However, the book proved an instant success with both critics and readers, selling out within two months of publication in 1974. Murphy continued working as a nanny until Allison & Busby's publication in 1980 of The Worst Witch Strikes Again prompted her to devote herself to writing full-time.
 
In 1986, a television film with the same title as her fantasy novel premiered on ITV. It later aired on The Disney Channel during the 1990s around the time of Halloween.

The Worst Witch stories have become some of the most successful titles on the Young Puffin paperback list and had sold more than three million copies by 2008, and more than five million worldwide as of 2016. They were also made into a successful 1986 film and an ITV series, broadcast on CITV between 1998 and 2001.

A musical stage production called The Worst Witch Live, adapted by Emma Reeves from Murphy's original work, was shown at the Royal & Derngate Theatre in Northampton as a Christmas show in 2018, and toured the UK in 2019 across some 16 different venues, including at the Vaudeville Theatre in London's West End from 24 July to 8 September 2019. The show received an Olivier Award for best family show in 2020.

Picture books
Murphy was also known for picture books, especially the Large Family series, which detail the domestic chaos of an elephant family. First published in 1986, Five Minutes Peace has sold more than five million copies worldwide and has been translated into 19 languages. For the second book, All in One Piece (1987), she was a commended runner-up for the Greenaway Medal from the British Library Association, recognising the year's best children's book by a British subject (the second of her two commendations). The Large Family is now a television series on CBeebies and ABC Kids. In 1996, The Last Noo-Noo was adapted as a play and performed at the Polka Theatre, London.

Murphy also wrote Dear Hound (2009), about a deerhound who goes missing after a storm and the quest for his owners to find him.

Personal life
Murphy was married and divorced twice, first to Peter Wilks, then to potter Roger Michell. Her son Charlie was born in 1990, from her second marriage. She lived in St Mabyn, Cornwall, where she died in hospital from cancer on 18 August 2021, aged 72.

Honours and recognition
In 2007, Murphy received an honorary fellowship from University College Falmouth.

Book awards

Works 

The Worst Witch

1. The Worst Witch (1974)
2. The Worst Witch Strikes Again (1980)
3. A Bad Spell for the Worst Witch (1982)
4. The Worst Witch All at Sea (1993)
5. The Worst Witch Saves the Day (2005)
6. The Worst Witch to the Rescue (2007)
7. The Worst Witch and the Wishing Star (2013)
8. First Prize for the Worst Witch (2018)

Large Family picture books
Five Minutes' Peace (1986)
All in One Piece (1987)
A Piece of Cake (1989)
A Quiet Night In (1993)
Mr. Large in Charge (2005)
Laura Bakes a Cake (2008)
Luke Tidies Up (2008)
Lester Learns a Lesson (2008)
Lucy Meets Mr Chilly (2008)
Grandpa In Trouble (2009)
Sebastian's Sleepover (2009)

Non-series novels
Worlds Apart (1988)
Jeffrey Strangeways (1992)
Dear Hound (2009)

Non-series picture books
Peace at Last (1980)
On the Way Home (1982)
Whatever Next! (1983)
The Last Noo-Noo (1995)
All for One (2002)
Mother Knows Best! (2011)
Meltdown! (2016)
Just One of Those Days (2020)

See also

Notes

References

External links
 
 Jill Murphy website - unofficial fan site 
 Jill Murphy at Walker Books
 
  (under "Murphy, Jill" without "1949–")
 Anna McKerrow, "'I didn’t know that women were allowed to be writers': Jill Murphy on the magic of making your own worlds and why Mildred Hubble is just like her", BookTrust, 6 September 2018.
 Sam Moore, "Jill Murphy death: The Worst Witch author dies aged 72" (with video "Jill Murphy introduces her latest children's story"), The Independent, 20 August 2021.

 WARNING: For most WorldCat records see instead "Murphy, Jill" (without "1949–").

1949 births
2021 deaths
20th-century English novelists
20th-century English women artists
20th-century English women writers
21st-century English novelists
21st-century English women artists
21st-century English women writers
British women children's writers
British women illustrators
Deaths from cancer in England
English children's book illustrators
English children's writers
English domestic workers
English fantasy writers
English people of Irish descent
English women novelists
Nannies
Women science fiction and fantasy writers
Writers from London